Taizu of Jin may refer to the following Chinese people who received the temple name Taizu after their deaths:

Sima Zhao (211–265), King of Jin
Li Keyong (856–908), Taizu of Later Tang, also known as Taizu of Jin
Wanyan Aguda (1068–1123), Taizu and founding emperor of Jin dynasty (1115–1234)
Nurhaci (1559–1626), Taizu and founding ruler of Later Jin (1616–1636)

See also
Shi Jingtang (892–942), founding emperor of Later Jin (936–947)
Taizu (disambiguation)
Jin (disambiguation)